Breast Cancer Awareness Month (BCAM), also referred to in the United States as National Breast Cancer Awareness Month (NBCAM), is an annual international health campaign organized by major breast cancer charities every October to increase awareness of the disease and raise funds for research into its cause, prevention, diagnosis, treatment, and cure.

Observances of the event have faced criticism for corporate involvement by drug companies, as well as instances of pinkwashing associated with the events.

History

NBCAM was founded in 1985 in partnership between the American Cancer Society and the pharmaceutical division of Imperial Chemical Industries (now part of AstraZeneca, producer of several anti-breast cancer drugs). The aim of the NBCAM from the start has been to promote mammography as the most effective weapon in the fight against breast cancer.

In 1993 Evelyn Lauder, Senior Corporate Vice President of the Estée Lauder Companies, founded the Breast Cancer Research Foundation and established the pink ribbon as its symbol, though this was not the first time the ribbon was used to symbolize breast cancer: A 68-year-old California woman named Charlotte Haley, whose sister, daughter, and granddaughter had breast cancer, had distributed peach-color ribbons to call attention to what she perceived as inadequate funding for research. In the fall of 1991, the Susan G. Komen Foundation handed out pink ribbons to participants in its New York City race for breast cancer survivors.

In 2010, Delta Air Lines painted N845MH, a Boeing 767-432ER in "Breast Cancer Research Foundation" special colors. In September 2015, a newer version of the livery was repainted on the same plane.

Activities and events

A variety of events around the world are organized in October, including walks, runs, and the pink illumination of landmark buildings.

Pakistan
The Pakistani branch of Leisure Leagues organized the 2020 Leisure Leagues Women Football's Pink Cup 2020, held in Karachi with eight women's teams playing and won by Diya W.F.C.

United States
In the United States, the National Football League promotes breast cancer awareness by incorporating pink on and off the field, and comic strip artists use pink on one day in October.

There are various walks to raise money for breast cancer programs. Coincidentally, two years before the first NBCAM was founded, the first Komen Race for the Cure was held in October 1983. It is now a year-round event.

Male breast cancer
Male breast cancer, which is rare, is generally overlooked.  In 2009 the male breast cancer advocacy groups Out of the Shadow of Pink, A Man's Pink, and the Brandon Greening Foundation for Breast Cancer in Men joined together to globally establish the third week of October as "Male Breast Cancer Awareness Week".

Criticisms 

Inspiration for the foundation of NBCAM came from Zeneca Inc. in 1989 when they began a breast cancer screening program within their company. In 1996, with the screening program and study complete, Zeneca Inc. analyzed the total monetary amounts lost due to the increase in health care provided compared with the total monetary amounts lost if the company was to scrap the program were compared. The total costs to the company of running the early detection program were estimated to be $400,000. Total costs to the company if they chose not to run the program were estimated to be around $1.5 million.

Pezzullo (2003) "(Astra)Zeneca’s initial justification for NBCAM was one of basic accounting, not a critique of how women’s healthcare has been assessed or implemented nor a desire to prevent women from developing breast cancer; instead, it was cost-effective for a company to detect cancer in its employees during the disease’s earlier stages."

Critics have said that "the BCAM idea 'was conceived and paid for by a British chemical company that both profits from this epidemic and may be contributing to its cause...'".

Sometimes referred to as National Breast Cancer Industry Month, critics of NBCAM point to a conflict of interest between corporations sponsoring breast cancer awareness while profiting from diagnosis and treatment. The breast cancer advocacy organization, Breast Cancer Action, has said repeatedly in newsletters and other information sources that October has become a public relations campaign that avoids discussion of the causes and prevention of breast cancer and instead focuses on "awareness" as a way to encourage women to get their mammograms. The term pinkwashing has been used by Breast Cancer Action to describe the actions of companies that manufacture and use chemicals that show a link with breast cancer and at the same time publicly support charities focused on curing the disease.  Other criticisms center on the marketing of "pink products" and tie-ins, citing that more money is spent marketing these campaigns than is donated to the cause. According to the New York Times in October 2015, fine print disclaimers on pink products sold by Dick's Sporting Goods reveal that in some instances, no money at all is donated to breast cancer research. Other companies cap the amount they give to research during each October's "pink" campaign but do not tell consumers when that cap has been reached.

Observances
In 1985, "National Breast Cancer Awareness Month" (NBCAM) was created as a collaborative effort between the American Academy of Family Physicians, AstraZeneca Healthcare Foundation, CancerCare, Inc., and a variety of other sponsors to raise awareness and gain funding for research for a cure."

See also 
List of health-related charity fundraisers
No Bra Day
Pink Bridge
Pink Hijab Day
Pink ribbon

References

External links
 US National Breast Cancer Awareness Month website
 Welcome to Cancerland, an essay by journalist and breast cancer survivor Barbara Ehrenreich on the culture and marketing of breast cancer

October observances
Breast cancer awareness
Breast cancer
Month-long observances
Observances in the United States
Health observances
Breast cancer organizations
Awareness months

hr:Mjesec borbe protiv raka dojke